Ipek or İpek may refer to:

People
 İpek (given name)
 Ipek Duben (born 1941), Turkish artist
 Assiya İpek (born 1993), Turkish women's weightlifter
 Emrah Ipek (born 1971), Turkish singer and actor
 Hasan İpek (born 1959), Turkish bureaucrat
 Ozan İpek (born 1986), Turkish professional footballer

Places
 İpek, the Turkish name of Peja, a city in Kosovo
 Birinci İpək, also called Ipec-1, in Azerbaijan
 İkinci İpək, also called Ipec-2, in Azerbaijan
 Sanjak of İpek, an administrative division of the Ottoman Empire

Other uses
 League of İpek, an Albanian political organization established in 1899
 İpek University, a former university in Ankara, Turkey

See also
 
 IPEC (disambiguation)
 İpək (disambiguation)

br:İpek